Henry C. Kohler (May 5, 1852 – August 27, 1934) was an American professional baseball player, who played 41 games during the ,  and  seasons.  He was born in Baltimore, Maryland and died there at the age of 82, and was interred at Loudon Park Cemetery.

References

External links

Baseball players from Baltimore
Major League Baseball infielders
Fort Wayne Kekiongas players
Baltimore Marylands players
Baltimore Canaries players
1852 births
1934 deaths
19th-century baseball players